Emam Abbas-e Sofla (also Romanized as Emām ʿAbbās-e Soflá) is a village in Jeygaran Rural District, Ozgoleh District, Salas-e Babajani County, Kermanshah Province, Iran. At the 2006 census, its population was 41, in 7 families.

References 

Populated places in Salas-e Babajani County